Valverde del Fresno is a municipality located in the province of Cáceres, Extremadura, Spain. According to the 2006 census (INE), the municipality has a population of 2576 inhabitants.

The local linguistic variety is the Fala language, different from both Spanish and Portuguese, but closer to the second.

References

Municipalities in the Province of Cáceres